Hochstein is a surname. Notable people with the surname include:

David Hochstein (1892–1918), American classical violinist
Erik Hochstein (born 1968), German swimmer
Grant Hochstein (born 1990), American figure skater
Russ Hochstein (born 1977), American football player